Otsego is an unincorporated community in Wyoming County, West Virginia, United States, along the Slab Fork and West Virginia Route 54. It was also known as Caloric.

Otsego is a name derived from a Native American language.

References

Unincorporated communities in West Virginia
Unincorporated communities in Wyoming County, West Virginia
Coal towns in West Virginia